The 1965 Quantico Marines Devil Dogs football team represented the Quantico Marine Base in the 1965 college football season. The team was led by first-year head coach Joe Caprara, who had played college football for Notre Dame. The team compiled a 6–4 record, while outscoring their opponents 177–101.

Schedule

Notes

References

Quantico
Quantico Marines Devil Dogs football seasons
Quantico Marines Devil Dogs football